49 Cancri is a single star in the zodiac constellation of Cancer, located 501 light years away from the Sun.  It has the Bayer designation b Cancri; 49 Cancri is the Flamsteed designation.  It is visible to the naked eye as a faint star with an apparent visual magnitude of about 5.6.  It is moving away from the Earth with a heliocentric radial velocity of +27.5 km/s.

49 Cancri is a variable star.  Its brightness changes from magnitude 5.58 to 5.71 every seven days.  It is classified as an α2 Canum Venaticorum variable, a class of magnetic chemically peculiar stars.  The brightness changes are thought to correspond to the rotation of the star.  49 Cancri is classified from its spectrum as an Ap star, with enhanced lines of silicon, europium, and chromium.  Additionally, calcium and magnesium lines are described as weaker than normal.

49 Cancri is classified as an A1 main sequence star. It radiates about a hundred times the luminosity of the Sun due to its high temperature and large size.

References

A-type main-sequence stars
Ap stars

Cancer (constellation)
Cancri, b
BD+10 1864
Cancri, 49
074521
042917
3465
Alpha2 Canum Venaticorum variables
Cancri, BI